The English-speaking world includes over 2 billion people globally who speak the English language as of the 2000s, making English the largest language by number of speakers, and the third largest language by number of native speakers. The regions where English is natively spoken by the majority of the population, due to cultural connections to England, are termed "the Anglosphere". Speakers of English are called Anglophones. 

England and the Scottish Lowlands, countries of the United Kingdom, are the birthplace of the English language, and the modern form of the language has been spread around the world since the 17th century, first by the worldwide influence of England and later the United Kingdom, and then by that of the United States. Through all types of printed and electronic media of these countries, English has become the leading language of international discourse and the lingua franca in many regions and professional contexts such as science, navigation and law. The United Kingdom remains the largest English-speaking country in Europe.

The United States and India have the most total English speakers, with 283 million and 125 million, respectively. There are also 108 million in Pakistan, 79 million in Nigeria, and 64 million in the Philippines. When those who speak English as a second language are included, estimates of the number of Anglophones vary greatly, from 470 million to more than 2 billion. David Crystal calculates that  non-native speakers outnumbered native speakers by a ratio of 3:1. , India claimed to have the world's second-largest English-speaking population: the most reliable estimate is around 10% of its population (125 million people), a number that is expected to have quadrupled by 2022. When native and non-native speakers are combined, English is the most widely spoken language worldwide. 

Besides the major varieties of English, such as American, British, Canadian, Australian, Irish, New Zealand English, and their sub-varieties, countries such as South Africa, India, Nigeria, the Philippines, Jamaica, and Trinidad and Tobago also have millions of native speakers of dialect continua ranging from English-based creole languages to Standard English. Other countries, such as Ghana and Uganda, also use English as their primary official languages.

Majority English-speaking countries

English is the primary natively spoken language in several countries and territories. Five of the largest of these are sometimes described as the "core Anglosphere"; they are the United States of America (with at least 231 million native English speakers), the United Kingdom (60 million), Canada (19 million), Australia (at least 17 million), and New Zealand (4.8 million). English is also the primary natively spoken language in Ireland. English based creoles are spoken by a majority of people in Jamaica, Trinidad and Tobago, Guyana, The Bahamas, Belize, Grenada, Barbados, Antigua and Barbuda, Dominica, Saint Lucia, Saint Vincent and the Grenadines, Saint Kitts and Nevis, and Suriname. English is also spoken by a majority of people as a second language in countries such as Denmark, Germany, the Netherlands, Slovenia, and Sweden.

Countries where English is an official language

 
In some countries where English is not the most spoken language, it is an official language or has some official status. These countries include Belize, Botswana, Cameroon (co-official with French), Eswatini (Swaziland), Fiji, Ghana, India, Kenya, Kiribati, Lesotho, Liberia, Malawi, Malaysia, Malta, the Marshall Islands, Mauritius, the Federated States of Micronesia, Namibia, Nigeria, Pakistan, Palau, Papua New Guinea, the Philippines, Rwanda, Samoa, Seychelles, Sierra Leone, Singapore, the Solomon Islands, Sri Lanka, Sudan, South Africa, South Sudan, Tanzania, The Gambia, Uganda, Zambia, and Zimbabwe. There also are countries where in a part of the territory English became a co-official language, in Colombia's San Andrés and Providencia, Hong Kong, Honduras's Bay Islands, and Nicaragua's Mosquito Coast. This was a result of the influence of British colonization and American colonization in these areas.

India has the largest number of second-language speakers of English (see Indian English); Crystal (2004) claims that, combining native and non-native speakers, India has more people who speak or understand English than any other country in the world. However, most scholars and research that has been conducted dispute his assertions. Pakistan also has the English language (Pakistani English) as a second official language after the Urdu language as the result of British rule (Raj). Sri Lanka and the Philippines use English as their third and second official language after Sinhala and Tamil, and Filipino, respectively.

English is one of the eleven official languages that are given equal status in South Africa (South African English), where there are 4.8 million native English speakers. It is also the official language in current dependent territories of Australia (Norfolk Island, Christmas Island and Cocos (Keeling) Islands) and of the United States of America (American Samoa, Guam, Northern Mariana Islands, Puerto Rico (in Puerto Rico, English is co-official with Spanish) and the US Virgin Islands), and Hong Kong Special Administrative Region of the People's Republic of China.

Although the United States federal government has no official languages, English has been given official status by 32 of the 50 US state governments. Furthermore, per United States nationality law, the process of becoming a naturalized citizen of the US entails a basic English proficiency test, which may be the most prominent example of the claim of the nation not having an official language being belied by policy realities.

English is also an important language in several former colonies and protectorates of the United Kingdom, such as Bahrain, Bangladesh, Brunei, Cyprus and the United Arab Emirates.

English as a global language

Because English is so widely spoken, it has often been referred to as a "world language", the lingua franca of the modern era, and while it is not an official language in most countries, it is currently the language most often taught as a foreign language. It is, by international treaty, the official language for aeronautical and maritime communications. English is one of the official languages of the United Nations and many other international organizations, including the International Olympic Committee. It is also one of two co-official languages for astronauts (besides the Russian language) serving on board the International Space Station.

English is studied most often in the European Union, and the perception of the usefulness of foreign languages among Europeans is 67% in favor of English ahead of 17% for German and 16% for French. Among some of the non-English-speaking EU countries, the following percentages of the adult population claimed to be able to converse in English in 2012: 90% in the Netherlands, 89% in Malta, 86% in Sweden and Denmark, 73% in Cyprus, Croatia, and Austria, 70% in Finland, and over 50% in Greece, Belgium, Luxembourg, Slovenia, and Germany. In 2012, excluding native speakers, 38% of Europeans consider that they can speak English.

Books, magazines, and newspapers written in English are available in many countries around the world, and English is the most commonly used language in the sciences with Science Citation Index reporting as early as 1997 that 95% of its articles were written in English, even though only half of them came from authors in English-speaking countries.

In publishing, English literature predominates considerably with 28 per cent of all books published in the world [Leclerc 2011] and 30 per cent of web content in 2011 (down from 50 per cent in 2000).

This increasing use of the English language globally has had a large impact on many other languages, leading to language shift and even language death, and to claims of linguistic imperialism. English itself has become more open to language shift as multiple regional varieties feed back into the language as a whole.

References

Bibliography

 

 

 

English and Diplomacy

World
Country classifications